Lenora may refer to:

Lenora Garfinkel (1930–2020), American architect
Lenora, Kansas, a city in the United States
Lenora, Minnesota, an unincorporated community
Lenora (Prachatice District), a municipality and village in the Czech Republic
Lenora (Pokémon), a Unova Gym Leader in the Pokémon franchise

See also
Lenorah, Texas
Leonora (disambiguation)